Harry Catterick (26 November 1919 – 9 March 1985) was an English football player and manager. As a player Catterick played for Everton and Crewe Alexandra, in a career that was interrupted by World War II, but he is most notable as a manager. After spells with Crewe, Rochdale and Sheffield Wednesday, with whom he won the Football League Second Division title, he took over at Everton and won the English Football League twice and the FA Cup with the Merseyside club and is regarded as one of Everton's most successful managers. He finished his managerial career at Preston North End.

Playing career
Catterick's father, Harry Catterick Sr, was a football player and coach for Stockport. Catterick Jr played at amateur level for Stockport Schoolboys and for Cheadle Heath Nomads before signing part-time for Everton as an 18-year-old in 1937. He was an apprentice marine engine engineer.

However, his professional career coincided with the Second World War so that his opportunities to play were limited. His wartime record with Everton saw him score 55 goals in 71 games. During the war, he also played for Manchester United and Stockport County.

He finally made his league debut in August 1946, aged 26.

Managerial career

Sheffield Wednesday
Replacing Eric Taylor in 1958, Catterick achieved much success in his three years with Sheffield Wednesday. He led to team to the Division 2 title in 1959 and reached the FA Cup semi-final the following season, losing to Blackburn Rovers. The following season, Wednesday were league runners-up to Tottenham Hotspur, who won the Double. Catterick left just before the end of the season following an approach from Everton.

Everton
Catterick took over from Johnny Carey in 1961. He soon began to motivate the team and made some astute signings. Under his authoritarian guidance, Everton won the First Division Championship in the 1962–63 season and the 1966 FA Cup Final. Although he narrowly lost the 1968 FA Cup Final, the same young team eventually dominated the 1969–70 season, winning the Championship again by one point short of a record points total. Catterick upheld Everton's tradition of cultured, attacking football.

Many tipped Everton to dominate the 1970s under Catterick. However, a dip in the team's morale saw Everton struggle in the league the following season. The sale of Alan Ball to Arsenal in December 1971 came as a surprise to supporters. The struggle by a previously great team seriously affected Catterick's health, and he suffered a severe heart attack on 5 January 1972 near Sheffield after watching the league cup semi-final between West Ham United and Stoke City. He spent 14 days in hospital in Sheffield, being discharged on 19 January, and returned later that season, but later said that he felt it took him 12 months to fully recover.

He was persuaded to accept a non-executive role at the club on 11 April 1973 by chairman John Moores. He held that role until becoming manager of Preston North End in August 1975. It was a role he remained in up to May 1977. In the Summer of 1977 Catterick wrote to the FA inquiring about the England managerial vacancy but never got a reply. After that Catterick worked as a scout for Southampton under the management of Lawrie MacMenemy.

The Shankly rivalry
While the manager of rivals Liverpool, Bill Shankly, was an extrovert, Catterick was the opposite; an introvert. He disliked that the press gave information about his team out to the public, even simple details such as the formation. He ensured that the players on the team-sheet were only listed in alphabetical order so that rival managers would not know the line-up.

He also disliked televised games as he wanted to keep Everton's playing style out of the public eye. His rival Shankly was the opposite, welcoming televised matches as he felt it frightened opposing teams.

Catterick once gave an "exclusive" story to a journalist that Everton had missed out on the signing of Preston North End's Howard Kendall and that Kendall had in fact opted to sign for Liverpool. The journalist published the story in the newspaper but hours later Kendall had in fact signed for Everton. It is claimed that Catterick had manipulated the media to score points off the field against Shankly.

Managerial statistics

Death
Catterick died of a heart attack shortly after watching Everton draw 2–2 with Ipswich Town in an FA Cup Sixth Round match at Goodison Park on 9 March 1985. He was 65 years old. His death came almost exactly five years after former Everton striker Dixie Dean had died while watching a game at the ground, also of a heart attack. Everton won the replay 1–0 and the players wore a black armband in honour of Catterick.

He is buried in the graveyard of St Anne's Church, St Anne's-on-the-Sea, Lancashire after a funeral held there six days after his death. His gravestone bears the Everton motto, "Nil satis nisi optimum".

Honours

Manager
Sheffield Wednesday
Football League Second Division: 1958–59
Everton
First Division: 1962–63, 1969–70
FA Cup: 1965–66
FA Charity Shield: 1963, 1970

In popular culture
Catterick was portrayed by Colin Welland in the 1997 TV film The Fix, which featured the events of the 1964 football betting scandal.

See also 
 List of English football championship-winning managers

References

External links

1919 births
1985 deaths
Footballers from Darlington
English footballers
English football managers
English Football Hall of Fame inductees
Association football forwards
Manchester United F.C. wartime guest players
Stockport County F.C. wartime guest players
Everton F.C. players
Crewe Alexandra F.C. players
Crewe Alexandra F.C. managers
Rochdale A.F.C. managers
Sheffield Wednesday F.C. managers
Everton F.C. managers
Preston North End F.C. managers
English Football League managers
Cheadle Heath Nomads F.C. players